Mioara Mugur-Schächter is a French-Romanian physicist, specialized in fundamental quantum mechanics, probability theory and information theory. She is also an epistemologist (methodologist) of scientific knowledge generation. As a professor of theoretical physics at the University of Reims, she founded the Laboratory of Quantum Mechanics and Information Structures, which she directed until 1997. She is currently president of the Centre pour la Synthèse d'une Épistémologie Formalisée.

Biography

Born in Romania, she arrived in France in 1962 from Bucharest. Her PhD thesis, of which the whole content had been elaborated beforehand in Bucharest and sent to Louis de Broglie, was published in a volume prefaced by de Broglie and published in the collection "Les grands problèmes des sciences", Gauthiers Villars, Paris, 1964.

She became a professor of theoretical physics at the University of Reims Champagne-Ardenne, where she founded the Laboratory for Quantum Mechanics and Information Structure, which she directed until 1997.

Selected publications 
 Étude du caractère complet de la théorie quantique (1964)
 The quantum mechanical one-system formalism, joint probabilities and locality, in Quantum Mechanics a half Century Later, J. L. Lopes and M. Paty, eds., Reidel, pp. 107-146, 1977
 Study of Wigner’s Theorem on Joint Probabilities, Found. Phys., Vol. 9, pp. 389-404, 1979.
 Le concept nouveau de fonctionnelle d’opacité d’une statistique. Etude des relations entre la loi des grands nombres, l’entropie informationnelle et l’entropie statistique, Anns. de l’Inst. H. Poincaré, Section A, vol XXXII, no. 1, pp. 33-71, 1980
 The Probabilistic-Informational Concept of an Opacity Functional, (en collab. Avec N. Hadjissavas), Kybernetes, pp.189-193, Vol. 11(3), 1982.
 Toward a Factually induced Spacetime Quantum Logic, Found. of  Phys., Vol. 22, No. 7, pp. 963-994, 1992
 Quantum Probabilities, Komogorov probabilities, and Informational Probabilities, Int. J. Theor. Phys., Vol. 33, No.1, pp. 53-90, 1994.

See also
 Constructivist epistemology

References

External links
 Her web site
 Introduction of the collective book "QUANTUM MECHANICS, MATHEMATICS, COGNITION AND ACTION : Proposals for a formalized epistemology"
 Article "Quantum mechanics versus a method of relativized conceptualization"

Year of birth missing (living people)
Living people
Romanian emigrants to France
Academic staff of the University of Reims Champagne-Ardenne
French physicists
Quantum physicists